Shir Morgh (also Romanized as Shīr Morgh) is a village in Qaen Rural District, in the Central District of Qaen County, South Khorasan Province, Iran. At the 2006 census, its population was 571, in 149 families.

References 

Populated places in Qaen County